Miss NY Chinese, also known as Miss New York Chinese or Miss Chinese New York and formerly called Miss Greater Chinatown NYC Beauty Pageant, is a beauty pageant that selects New York City's representative to the Miss Chinese International beauty pageant held in Hong Kong each year. Notable winners include Michelle Ye and Fala Chen. Participants must be between the ages of 17 and 25 with a basic understanding of the Chinese language, among other requirements.

List of winners
Note: The winners from 1992 to 2000 held the title Miss Greater Chinatown NYC. In 2002, the pageant's name was changed to Miss NY Chinese. The omitted years represent no New York representative to the pageant. The Miss New York Chinese Pageant started in 2001.

1 Age at the time of the Miss Chinese International pageant

Acting success
Past winners have gone on to work in the entertainment industry (e.g., acting, singing) in China (Hong Kong and mainland), but this is not a guarantee. Most notable is Michelle Ye, who was a TVB actress for six years. Fala Chen is also an actress in TVB now. Nicole Wang is currently in Mainland China for acting.

See also
Miss Chinese International
Miss Chinese Vancouver
Miss Chinese Toronto

References

External links
Official Site
 "Miss New York Chinese 2007 Pageant winners celebrate in style"
 Miss New York Chinese 2006 and 2007 Pageant Coverage - Meniscus Magazine

New York
Chinese-American culture in New York City
Beauty pageants in the United States
1993 establishments in New York City
History of women in New York City
Women in New York City
Asian-American women's organizations